Christopher Moeller (born May 1, 1963) is an American writer and painter, specializing in fully painted graphic novels. Moeller's signature creation is the Iron Empires science-fiction universe, comprising three fully painted graphic novels Faith Conquers, Sheva's War and Void, a short story in Dark Horse Presents, and a second in the anthology Negative Burn.  In 2006, an Iron Empires role-playing game was published, called Burning Empires.

Early life and education
Moeller was born in Ithaca, New York and currently lives in Mt. Lebanon, Pennsylvania.

He received a BFA in painting from the University of Michigan School of art, and an MFA in illustration from Syracuse University.

Comics career
His professional debut was in 1991, writing and painting Innovation Comic's Rocketman: King of the Rocketmen.  This was followed by a run on the adaptation of Anne Rice's Interview with the Vampire, also from Innovation, for which he provided artwork and a number of cover illustrations.

Moeller moved to Dark Horse Comics in 1994, writing and painting the first of his Iron Empires graphic novels (at that time called Shadow Empires) Faith Conquers, as well as the short story "The Passage" in Dark Horse Presents #79-81.  He illustrated Andrew Vachss' short story "Treatment", included in Vachss' 2002 graphics-adapted collection Hard Looks. He also did James Bond covers, a number of Star Wars covers, and a "pop-up" Star Wars book called Battle of the Bounty-Hunters. 

In 1998, Moeller wrote and painted his second Iron Empires graphic novel, Sheva's War, for the short-lived Science Fiction imprint of DC Comics, Helix.  That was followed by a run of covers for DC's Batman monthly comic book Shadow of the Bat.  In 2000, he wrote and painted the graphic novel JLA: A League of One.  He did an extended run of covers for the Vertigo monthly comic book Lucifer.  In 2005, he wrote and painted the graphic novel JLA Classified: Cold Steel.

Gaming career
Moeller has worked in the gaming industry in parallel with his comics work.  He has done numerous illustrations for White Wolf Games, including covers for their Aberrant game books, and miniatures game.  He has provided over 250+ illustrations for the trading card game Magic: the Gathering.  He has done illustrations for the World of Warcraft trading card game.  He did the packaging art for the Axis and Allies Miniatures game. He also did the artwork for the Burning Empires (role-playing game) based on his own Iron Empires graphic novels.

Selected bibliography
1991 Rocketman: King of the Rocketmen graphic novel. 128pp in four comics and paperback collection.  Innovation Comics.
1993 "The Passage" short story in the Dark Horse Presents anthology.  24pp in three chapters( colored version included in 2004 Faith Conquers paperback).  Dark Horse Comics.
1994 Shadow Empires: Faith Conquers graphic novel (later renamed Iron Empires: Faith Conquers).  128pp in four comics ( collected in 2004 in paperback).  Dark Horse Comics.
1996 "Second Passage" short story in the Negative Burn anthology.  Co-written by Kevin Moeller.  48pp in six chapters.  Caliber Comics.
1998 Iron Empires: Sheva's War graphic novel.  150pp in five comics (collected in 2004 in paperback from Dark Horse Comics). Helix (DC Comics imprint)
2001 JLA: A League of One graphic novel. 102pp. Hardcover & Paperback. DC Comics.
2005 JLA Classified: Cold Steel graphic novel.  96pp in two prestige-format comics. DC Comics.
2014 Iron Empires: Void graphic novel. 90pp. Forged Lord Comics

References

External links
Official website
Review of Faith Conquers
A short documentary about Christopher Moeller by Sean and Noriko Sakamoto

1963 births
American comics artists
Fayetteville-Manlius High School alumni
Game artists
Living people
Writers from Ithaca, New York
People from Mt. Lebanon, Pennsylvania
Penny W. Stamps School of Art & Design alumni
Artists from Ithaca, New York
Syracuse University alumni